Smash is a brand of Instant mashed potatoes in the United Kingdom. It was launched in the United Kingdom in the 1960s by Cadbury, which was primarily a manufacturer of confectionery at the time. Smash was reasonably successful.

However, it was not until 1974 that Smash became popular in the convenience food market after Cadbury launched an advertising campaign by agency Boase Massimi Pollitt featuring the Smash Martians, who would watch humans preparing mashed potato the traditional way on television instead of using potato granules, and laugh at them.

The adverts of 1970s and their catchphrase, 'For Mash get Smash', were voted television advert of the century by Campaign Magazine, and second-best television advert of all time in a poll of April 2000 conducted by The Sunday Times and Channel 4, beaten by Guinness' Surfer advertisement from 1999.

The brand has since been sold by Cadbury and is now owned by Premier Foods who, using their Batchelors brand, launched a 'healthier recipe' version in 2006.

Accolades 
The original 1970s advertisements have been featured in several "best ever television advertisements" lists.

References

External links 
Premier Foods' list of brands

Cadbury brands
Potatoes
Premier Foods brands
Instant foods and drinks